Vilić Selo is a village in Požega-Slavonia County, Croatia. The village is administered as a part of the Brestovac municipality.
According to national census of 2011, population of the village is 185. The village is connected by the D38 state road.

Sources

Populated places in Požega-Slavonia County